The Nairobi airport rail link is an infrastructure project in Nairobi, in Kenya.

The government of Kenya has proposed a rapid rail connection between Jomo Kenyatta International Airport and central Nairobi. As of October 2010, construction was under way, and tenders had been awarded. The project costs 800 million shillings ($US9.13m), and involves 2 km of new rail to connect to the existing railway at Embakasi

Stations

The line will likely begin at the existing Nairobi Railway Station along an existing line to
and a 2 km extension to Jomo Kenyatta International Airport.

There are number of stations and stops along the current rail route to Embakasi:

 Makadara Railway Station - existing station
 Donholm Rail Stop - minor stop 
 Stage MPYA Rail Stop - minor stop
 Pipeline Rail Stop - minor stop
 Embakasi Railway Station - existing station

Both Makadara and Embakasi stations will be rebuilt for airport link and all other stops either removed or rebuilt.

See also 
 Railway stations in Kenya

References

External links 
 Kenya Airports Authority

Transport in Nairobi
Airport rail links
Railway lines in Kenya
Proposed transport infrastructure in Kenya
Metre gauge railways in Kenya